Canada competed at the 2002 Winter Olympics in Salt Lake City, Utah, United States. Canada has competed at every Winter Olympic Games.

These games were the second best ever for Canada at the time, as they finished in fourth place in the medal standings with 17 medals, seven of which were gold.

Medalists

Notable events
Canada won double gold in ice hockey after going 50 years without a gold medal. Both the women's and men's teams won gold, beating the United States in both games.
Marc Gagnon, a short-track speed skater, won double gold, and a bronze medal. One of his golds was for the 5000 m relay team.
Catriona Le May Doan capped off an impressive speed skating career winning gold in the 500 m. She became the first Canadian to defend their gold medal, which she first won at the 1998 Games.
Jamie Salé and David Pelletier won gold in the pairs figure skating event. They were given the gold after a controversy involving the French judge of their event. Both the Canadians and their Russian rivals would win gold in the same event.
Beckie Scott became the first North American to win a medal in cross-country skiing, when she placed third in her event. Later on however, she was bumped up to gold when the two finishers ahead of her were disqualified.
Clara Hughes made the transition from bronze medalist cyclist to bronze medalist speed skater when she finished 3rd in the 5000 m.
Jeremy Wotherspoon, expected to win gold in his event, but disappointed many when he tripped and fell after starting in his 500 m event.
Elvis Stojko finished his career with an 8th-place finish in the men's figure skating event.

Alpine skiing

Men

Women

Biathlon

Bobsleigh

Cross-country skiing

Distance

Sprint

Curling

Men's tournament

Group stage
Top four teams advanced to semi-finals.

|}

Medal round
Semi final

Gold medal game

Women's tournament

Group stage
Top four teams advanced to semi-finals.

|}

Medal round
Semi final

Bronze medal game

Figure skating

Men

Women

Pairs

Ice Dancing

Freestyle skiing

Men

Women

Ice hockey

Men's tournament

First round – Group C

All times are local (UTC-7).

Knock-out stage
Quarter final

Semi final

Gold medal game

Contestants

Source: 
 Gold -

Women's tournament

Group stage – Group A
Top two teams (shaded) advanced to semifinals.

All times are local (UTC-7).

Knock-out stage
Semi final

Gold medal game

Contestants

Luge

Short track speed skating

Men

Women

Skeleton

Snowboarding

Halfpipe

Parallel GS

Speed skating

Men

Women

Official outfitter

 Roots Canada was the official outfitter of clothing for members of the Canadian Olympic team. The same clothing was also sold at Roots stores in Canada.

References

 
 Olympic Winter Games 2002, full results by sports-reference.com

2002
Nations at the 2002 Winter Olympics
Winter Olympics